Vladimir III Svyatoslavich (after 1143 – autumn of 1200) was a Rus' prince (a member of the Rurik dynasty). His baptismal name was Boris. He was prince of Gomiy (1164–?), of Novgorod (1180–1181, 1181–1182), of Karachev (1194–?), and probably of Novgorod-Seversk (1198–1200).

His early life
He was the third son of Svyatoslav Vsevolodovich (who later become the Grand Prince of Kiev), by his wife Maria Vasilkovna of Polotsk. His father appointed Vladimir to Gomiy (which was an important regional center) when prince Svyatoslav Olgovich of Chernigov (Svyatoslav Vsevolodovich’s uncle) died on February 15, 1164.

In 1175, Vladimir commanded the vanguard force when his father accompanied Mikhalko and Vsevolod Yurevich whom the townspeople of Suzdalia had invited to be their prince. On June 15, they won the day against Mstislav Rostislavich of Rostov and Yaropolk Rostislavich of Vladimir. Shortly afterwards, Mikhalko and Vsevolod Yurevich gave many gifts to Vladimir.

When war broke out in Suzdalia in the winter of 1177, Svyatoslav Vsevolodovich sent his sons (Vladimir and Oleg) to help Vsevolod Yurevich attack prince Gleb Rostislavich of Ryazan, who was harboring Mstislav and Yaropolk Rostislavich. In 1179, Vsevolod Yurevich invited Vladimir to Suzdalia and gave to Vladimir his niece, the daughter of his deceased brother Mikhalko Yurevich, as wife. Vladimir returned to Chernigov, where he presented his wife to his father.

On June 14, 1180, prince Mstislav Rostislavich of Novgorod died. For reasons not given, the townsmen chose not to invite another Rostislavich (a member of the dynasty of the princes of Smolensk) or Vsevolod Yurevich of Suzdalia; instead, they asked Svyatoslav Vsevolodovich to send a son. He dispatched Vladimir and the Novgorodians enthroned him on August 17.

Svyatoslav Vsevolodovich’s increased power, however, strained his relations with the prince of Suzdalia; the latter marched against prince Roman Glebovich of Ryazan and take Svyatoslav Vsevolodovich’s son (Yaroslav’s brother) Gleb Svyatoslavich captive. Svyatoslav Vsevolodovich assembled all his brothers and the Cumans to avenge himself against Vsevolod Yurevich and to free from captivity his son; Vladimir also brought Novgorodian troops. The campaign, however, turned into a farce: Vsevolod Yurevich deftly deflected Svyatoslav Vsevolodovich’s every attempt to initiate battle.

Around March 1181, Svyatoslav Vsevolodovich accompanied Vladimir to Novgorod. The Novgorod First Chronicle suggests that the Novgorodians took Svyatoslav Vsevolodovich to become their prince and he entered Novgorod as their ruler. To judge from later information, Svyatoslav Vsevolodovich planned to remain in Novgorod for a short period of time, hand it over to his son, and then return to Kiev. Before leaving Novgorod, Svyatoslav Vsevolodovich secured his authority there; this is confirmed by the citizens’ decision to install Vladimir as prince. However, at the beginning of 1182, it would seem, the Novgorodians expelled Vladimir and he returned to his father.

At the beginning of 1183, Vsevolod Yurevich declared war on the Volga Bulgars and asked Svyatoslav Vsevolodovich for assistance. The latter complied by sending his eldest son, Vladimir.

After learning of Igor Svyatoslavich’s defeat at the Kayala River on May 12, 1185, Svyatoslav Vsevolodovich sent his two sons (Vladimir and Oleg) to the Poseme region (along the Seym River) to serve as interim defenders of the Seversk towns. The information that he sent two sons suggests that he ordered them to occupy Rylsk and Putyvl, which had recently lost their princes. Their main task would have been to close the "gates into the land of Rus'". According to the chronicler, the Cumans assembled their entire nation to march against Rus’, but the khans argued. Finally, Khan Koza attacked Putivl but failed to take it. After Koza pillaged the region, Vladimir and Oleg Svyatoslavich departed from Putivl and Rylsk.

In 1192, Svyatoslav Vsevolodovich sent his three sons (Vladimir, Vsevolod and Mstislav) against the Cumans who had frequently pillaged the Chernigov lands, and he placed Igor Svyatoslavich (his cousin) in command of the campaign. The purpose of the campaign was to plunder Cuman camps. The Olgovichi ventured deep into the steppe, past Kursk into the upper reaches of the Oskol River. However the nomads assembled in great numbers and awaited the princes; on seeing that he was outnumbered, Igor Svyatoslavich resolutely ordered his troops to steal away under the cover of darkness.

Svyatoslav Vsevolodovich died during the last week of July 1194; his death changed the order of seniority among the Olgovichi: his sons became answerable to their uncle prince Yaroslav II Vsevolodovich of Chernigov, the new senior prince of the dynasty.

From 1196, Vladimir is never mentioned as participating in campaigns. It would appear, therefore, that he had withdrawn from the political arena, perhaps owing to poor health.

On an unspecified date in 1198, Yaroslav Vsevolodovich died, and Igor Svyatoslavich became the prince of Chernigov. It is difficult to determine who succeeded Igor Svyatoslavich to Novgorod-Seversk: the rightful claimant to the town was likely Vladimir who was the senior prince of the senior branch of the Olgovichi.

Vladimir was probably interred in the Church of the Annuciation in Chernigov that his father had built.

Marriage
#1179: Evdokia Mikhaylovna, the daughter of prince Mikhalko Yurevich of Vladimir

They evidently had no sons.

Ancestors

Footnotes

Sources
Dimnik, Martin: The Dynasty of Chernigov - 1146-1246; Cambridge University Press, 2003, Cambridge; .

12th-century princes in Kievan Rus'
Olgovichi family
Princes of Novgorod
Eastern Orthodox monarchs
Princes of Novgorod-Seversk